WAAZ-FM (104.7 MHz) is a commercial FM radio station broadcasting a country music format. Licensed to Crestview, Florida, United States, the station serves the Ft Walton Beach metropolitan area.  The 100,000 watt signal can be heard in parts of the Florida Panhandle and Southern Alabama.   The station is owned by Crestview Broadcasting Company, Inc. with its studios and transmitter off West First Avenue.

The station is off the air from 12am to 5am Monday through Saturday and 12am to 7am on Sunday because the station is 100 percent live with no automation. 

In early 2013, the station got a facelift in its equipment, along with a website and audio stream.

WAAZ-FM carries Atlanta Braves baseball and Troy University sports as well as news from CBS News Radio.

References

External links

AAZ-FM
Country radio stations in the United States
1965 establishments in Florida
Radio stations established in 1965